Vincent Lunabek is a Vanuatuan legal and political figure.

Lunabek was appointed a Supreme Court of Vanuatu justice in 1996. Since 2001, he has served as the Chief Justice of the Supreme Court.

References

Vanuatuan lawyers
Vanuatuan politicians
Vanuatuan judges
Living people
Chief justices
Year of birth missing (living people)
Supreme Court of Vanuatu judges